The 1964 Thomas Cup competition is an international team tournament for supremacy in men's badminton (its female counterpart is the Uber Cup). Beginning in 1948–49 it was held every three years until 1982 and thereafter it has been held every two years. Twenty-six national teams, each (except the defending champion nation) starting from one of four qualifying zones (Asia, Australasia, Europe, and Pan America), vied for the Thomas Cup during the 1963-1964 badminton season. Qualifying zone winners played-off in Tokyo, Japan for the right to face defending champion Indonesia, which was exempt from earlier ties (team matches), in a conclusive challenge round tie. Prior to 1964 the defending champion nation had regularly hosted both the inter-zone playoffs and the challenge round, but a rules change effective that year prevented the same defending champion nation from having this advantage for two successive Thomas Cup seasons. For a more detailed description of the Thomas Cup format see Wikipedia's general article on the Thomas Cup.

Intra-zone summary
With Malaya and India competing in the Australasian zone, and Japan competing in the Pan American zone, Thailand, the 1961 Thomas Cup runner-up, won the Asian zone by shutting out Taiwan (9–0). After missing the 1960-1961 series, Charoen Wattanasin had returned to the team, while Thailand's other top singles player, Channarong Ratanaseangsuang (living in California) would rejoin the team for the inter-zone matches.

In the Australasian zone a rebuilding Malaya (soon to be Malaysia), with no hold-overs from its champion teams of the 1950s, defeated India (8–1) and Australia (9–0) to advance to the inter-zone playoffs. All-rounder Teh Kew San went eight for eight in this set of ties. Previously the domain of only the USA and Canada, the Pan American zone welcomed Jamaica, Mexico, and "outsider" Japan. The Japanese, however, proved their mettle by shutting out Mexico and by defeating Canada 8–1. In the zone final against the USA, which had won all previous Pan American zone qualifications, Japan prevailed 7–2, despite two singles victories by American stalwart Jim Poole. Playing doubles and third singles, Japan's team captain, Eiichi Nagai won all of his nine matches in this series of ties.

Denmark again won the European zone handily, brushing aside England 8–1 in the final. The Danish lineup boasted five time All-England singles champion Erland Kops (still only 27), the reigning All-England champion Knud Aage Nielsen, the All-England singles runner-up, Henning Borch, and the reigning and six time All-England doubles champions, Finn Kobbero and Jorgen Hammergaard Hansen. With the final ties scheduled for temperate Tokyo rather than equatorial and partisan Jakarta, many observers thought that this would be Denmark's "year."

Inter-zone playoffs
5 teams from 4 regions took part in this edition. As defending champion, Indonesia was exempt until the  Challenge Round.

Australasia
 Malaya
 Indonesia (exempt until Challenge Round)

Asia
 Thailand

Europe
 Denmark

Americas
 Japan

Collectively, the players contesting in Tokyo in mid May were probably the strongest group that had yet appeared at the final venue of the Thomas Cup competition. Even "third string" singles matches often pitted true world class opponents against each other. With more difficulty than might have been expected, Thailand eliminated the host country's team 6–3. Ratanaseangsuang and Wattanasin won hard-fought singles matches, but the vaunted Thai doubles teams could earn only a split with their equally quick and aggressive Japanese counterparts. Yoshinori Itagaki had a hand in two winning matches for Japan. In the other semifinal Denmark's powerful singles lineup shutout Malaya's, though individual matches were competitive. Eighteen-year-old Tan Aik Huang served notice of future achievement by earning twenty-six points from Erland Kops. Denmark advanced 7–2 with Malaya's wins coming against the Danish "second string" doubles.

The inter-zone final between Denmark and Thailand was a fierce struggle featuring five three game matches. Denmark won four of the five to avenge its 1961 defeat and squeeze past Thailand 6–3. Kobbero and Hammergaard Hansen "got even" with the same pairs (Bhornchima and Kanchanaraphi; Chumkum and Vatanatham) that had defeated them in '61. Kops won three game singles matches against both Ratanaseangsuang and Wattanasin. As had happened against Malaya, however, he lost both of his doubles matches paired with P. E. Nielsen. The result of the Danish strategy of using Erland Kops in the maximum number of matches in all ties was that he had now played 20 pressure filled games (twice as many as any of his teammates) without losing a singles match but without winning a doubles. This strategy was not altered, however, for the decisive Challenge Round against Indonesia.

Semifinal round

Final round

Challenge round
Though Indonesia's doubles teams had contributed to its Thomas Cup successes in 1958 and in 1961, its singles players had led the way by losing only two matches in thirty and none in either Challenge Round. By 1964, however, "big guns" Tan Joe Hok and Ferry Sonneville were seemingly past their primes. Though only 26, Tan Joe Hok had been busy with studies and had played tournaments only infrequently and not very successfully over the previous two seasons. Sonneville was 33 and his last major tournament victories were also about two years old. 

Thomas Cup competition, however, brought out the best in these two players. It also brought out the worst in some of Indonesia's fans in Tokyo whose behavior crossed the line from rabid cheering and barracking to outright interference with play. Especially egregious was the deliberate use of flash photography when Danish players were facing their cameras. Ultimately, Denmark's Erland Kops became something of a "goat" losing to both Tan Joe Hok and Ferry Sonneville, despite being 14-6 up in the second game against Sonneville after winning the first. Sonneville also beat All-England champion Knud Aage Nielsen who was able to gain a split by defeating Tan in three games. With the victory of Indonesia's "secret weapon" Ang Tjin Siang (later known as Muljadi) over Borch, the Indonesians, against form, took four of the five singles matches. Nevertheless, with the brilliant Kobbero and Hammergaard Hansen unbeaten throughout the entire campaign, the Danes still had a chance at 3–4 when Erland Kops and Borch met Tan King Gwan and Abdul Patah Unang in the eighth match of the tie. When the Danes won the first game at 15-12 crowd dissension became so intense that play was delayed for 20 minutes. After it resumed the Indonesians gradually gained control of the match to win it 15-6 in the third. The Cup, once again, had eluded Denmark's grasp. An official Danish protest against the result was eventually denied by the International Badminton Federation (now the Badminton World Federation).

References
 tangkis.tripod.com
Herbert Scheele ed., The International Badminton Federation Handbook for 1967 (Canterbury, Kent,      England: J. A. Jennings Ltd., 1967) 82–87.
Pat Davis, The Guinness Book of Badminton (Enfield, Middlesex, England: Guinness Superlatives Ltd., 1983) 122, 123.
 Mike's Badminton Populorum 

Thomas Cup
Thomas Cup
Thomas & Uber Cup
T
Badminton tournaments in Japan